Intracranial hypertension syndrome is characterized by an elevated intracranial pressure, papilledema, and headache with occasional abducens nerve paresis, absence of a space-occupying lesion or ventricular enlargement, and normal cerebrospinal fluid chemical and hematological constituents.

References

Neurological disorders
Syndromes